Herpetopoma sulciferum is a species of sea snail, a marine gastropod mollusk in the family Chilodontidae.

Description
(Original description by A. Adams, in Latin) "Testa globoso-conica, umbilicata, fusca, cingulis granorum distantium moniliformibus, interstitiis profunde sulcatis, sulcis sublaevis, longitudinaliter striatis ornata; columella ad basin trisulcata, dente parvo acuto instructa; labro tenui, intus sulcato."

Distribution
This marine species occurs off Northwest Australia.

References

External links
 To Encyclopedia of Life
 To World Register of Marine Species

sulciferum
Gastropods described in 1853